Sechlerville is an unincorporated community located in the town of Hixton, Jackson County, Wisconsin, United States.

The community is named after Jacob R. Sechler, who moved to the area in 1855.  It once had a local post office which closed in the 1950s.

Notes

Unincorporated communities in Jackson County, Wisconsin
Unincorporated communities in Wisconsin